The 1932 Washington and Lee Generals football team was an American football team that represented Washington and Lee University during the 1932 college football season as a member of the Southern Conference. In their sixth year under head coach Jimmy DeHart, the team compiled an overall record of 1–9, with a mark of 1–4 in conference play.

Schedule

References

Washington and Lee
Washington and Lee Generals football seasons
Washington and Lee Generals football